Test match number 1073, described as, one of the greatest and most dramatic Test matches between India and Pakistan, it was the fifth and final Test of the Pakistani tour of India. The match was won by Pakistan by 16 runs after the previous four matches had ended in draws. It was the final Test played by India's Sunil Gavaskar.

Details

Day 1 – 13 March
As Sunil Gavaskar was playing his final Test match the Indian captain Kapil Dev allowed him to take part in the toss as a token of respect. Pakistan's Imran Khan won the toss and chose to bat first. After Kapil Dev dismissed opening batsman Rizwan-uz-Zaman for 1, Pakistan had a second wicket partnership of 36 runs between Rameez Raja and Saleem Malik. Pakistan then lost six wickets for just 14 runs with Maninder Singh claiming five wickets, leaving Pakistan on 74 for 8. Pakistan fought back, adding 42 runs for the last two wickets before being all out for 116 in just 49.2 overs. For India Maninder Singh claimed 7 wickets for 27 runs with Kapil Dev (2) and Ravi Shastri claiming the other wickets.

After an opening wicket partnership of 39 between Gavaskar and Srikkanth, India finished the day on 68 for 2 with Mohinder Amarnath and Dilip Vengsarkar remained unbeaten on 12 and 9 runs respectively.

Day 2 – 14 March
India soon gained a lead over Pakistan and at one stage were 126 for 4 before being dismissed for 145 runs, a lead of only 29 runs. Vengsarkar made a patient 50, but no other Indian batsmen made a double digit score. Both Pakistani spin bowlers Iqbal Qasim and Tauseef Ahmed claimed five wickets each.

In their second innings, Pakistan had a safe start with Javed Miandad opening the innings along with Saleem Malik. An opening wicket partnership of 45 runs set of solid foundation before Pakistan fell to 155 for 5 at the end of the day, an overall lead of 126 runs.

Day 3 – 15 March
Three wickets fell on the morning of the third day, with captain Imran the eight Pakistani batsman dismissed with the score on 198 for 8, a lead of 169 runs. Saleem Yousuf, scoring 41 runs, and Tauseef Ahmed added 51 runs for the ninth wicket before the side were bowled out for 249 runs, leaving India a target of 221 runs with the pitch becoming very difficult for the batsmen. For India, Ravi Shastri claimed four wickets, Maninder three and Yadav two.

Pakistan shocked India with two early wickets as Wasim Akram dismissed Srikkanth and Amarnath in successive deliveries with India reeling at 15 for 2. Vengsarkar joined Gavaskar and their partnership made 49 runs before Vengsarkar was clean bowled by Tauseef with Indian score reading 64 for 3. Wicket-keeper Kiran More was sent in as night watchman, but he was out for 3 and at the end of the third day India were 99 for 4 with Azharuddin and Gavaskar on 7 and 51 runs respectively, needing another 122 runs to win.

Day 4 – 17 March
On the rest day (16 March), Pakistan bowlers Iqbal Qasim and Tauseef Ahmed happened to meet Bishan Singh Bedi at a reception, who advised them not to try too much on the turning pitch.
 
On the fourth day India resumed their innings on a crumbling pitch. Gavaskar and Azharuddin brought the target under 100 runs, but Azharuddin was brilliantly caught and bowled by Iqbal Qasim for 26. Shastri had a 30 runs partnership with Gavaskar as he was caught and bowled, again by Iqbal Qasim at the score on 155. After Kapil Dev was out for two, India went to lunch on 161/7, still needing 60 runs to win. After adding 19 runs after lunch, Sunil Gavaskar was controversially given out caught off of his wrist for 96 in his final Test innings. India still needed another 41 runs to win, but lost Shivlal Yadav for four and last man Maninder Singh joined Roger Binny with 36 more runs needed to win. Binny counter attacked Tauseef with a six, but was caught by Saleem Yousuf off Tauseef Ahmed for 15 as India were bowled out for 204 runs, Pakistan winning the match by 16 runs.

The match was the only one of the five-match series which ended in a victory, meaning Pakistan won the series 1–0. Gavaskar was adjudged the Player of the Match and Imran Khan Player of the Series.

Scorecard

First innings
 

Fall of wickets: 1/3 (Rizwan-uz-Zaman), 2/39 (Ramiz Raja), 3/60 (Javed Miandad), 4/60 (Manzoor Elahi), 5/68 (Saleem Malik), 6/68 (Imran Khan), 7/73 (Wasim Akram), 8/74 (Saleem Yousuf), 9/98 (Iqbal Qasim), 10/116 (Saleem Jaffar)

 

Fall of wickets: 1/39 (Kris Srikkanth), 2/56 (Sunil Gavaskar), 3/71 (Mohinder Amarnath), 4/102 (Mohammad Azharuddin), 5/126 (Ravi Shastri), 6/130 (Dilip Vengsarkar), 7/135 (Roger Binny), 8/137 (Kapil Dev), 9/143 (Shivlal Yadav), 10/145 (Maninder Singh)

Second innings
 

Fall of wickets: 1/45 (Javed Miandad), 2/57 (Rizwan-uz-Zaman), 3/89 (Ramiz Raja), 4/121 (Saleem Malik), 5/142 (Iqbal Qasim), 6/166 (Manzoor Elahi), 7/184 (Wasim Akram), 8/198 (Imran Khan), 9/249 (Tauseef Ahmed), 10/249 (Saleem Jaffar)

 

Fall of wickets: 1/15 (Kris Srikkanth), 2/15 (Mohinder Amarnath), 3/64 (Dilip Vengsarkar), 4/80 (Kiran More), 5/123 (Mohammad Azharuddin), 6/155 (Ravi Shastri), 7/161 (Kapil Dev), 8/180 (Sunil Gavaskar), 9/185 (Shivlal Yadav), 10/204 (Roger Binny)

References 

1987 in cricket
1987 in Pakistani cricket
1987 in Indian cricket
1986-87
Indian cricket seasons from 1970–71 to 1999–2000
International cricket competitions from 1985–86 to 1988